Roland Omoruyi (born 5 June 1959) is a Nigerian boxer. He competed at the 1980 Summer Olympics and the 1984 Summer Olympics.

References

1959 births
Living people
Nigerian male boxers
Olympic boxers of Nigeria
Boxers at the 1980 Summer Olympics
Boxers at the 1984 Summer Olympics
Boxers at the 1982 Commonwealth Games
Commonwealth Games bronze medallists for Nigeria
Commonwealth Games medallists in boxing
Place of birth missing (living people)
AIBA World Boxing Championships medalists
Welterweight boxers
Medallists at the 1982 Commonwealth Games